Whitehorse Manningham Regional Library Corporation provides library services to the City of Manningham and the City of Whitehorse. City of Manningham covers 114 square kilometres. The estimated population was 119,442 in 2015. The languages spoken include Cantonese, Greek, Mandarin, Italian and Arabic. The City of Whitehorse covers 64 square kilometres. The estimated population was 163,697 in 2014. The languages spoken include Cantonese, Mandarin, Greek, Italian, Vietnamese.

The combined library service was established in 1996 on the amalgamation of the City of Nunawading Library Service and the Box Hill/Doncaster Library Service.

Branch libraries 
There are eight branch libraries. 
 Blackburn
 Box Hill
 Bulleen
 Doncaster
 Nunawading
 The Pines
 Vermont South
 Warrandyte.

External references 

The City of Manningham

The City of Whitehorse

References 

Libraries in Melbourne
City of Manningham
City of Whitehorse
Libraries established in 1996
1996 establishments in Australia